FC CSKA Almaty (Stska Almaty Fýtbol Klýby) is a Kazakhstani football club based in Almaty.

History
CSKA Almaty was formed in 2009 and made its debut in the 2010 Kazakhstan First Division, finishing 17th.

Domestic history

References
The team's squad in 2010

Association football clubs established in 2009
Football clubs in Almaty
Football clubs in Kazakhstan
2009 establishments in Kazakhstan